Thazha Varkey Paul (born in 1956) is an Indo-Canadian political scientist. He is a James McGill professor of International Relations in the department of Political Science at McGill University. Paul specializes in International Relations, especially international security, regional security and South Asia. He served as the president of the International Studies Association (ISA) during 2016–2017, and served as the founding director of the McGill University – Université de Montreal Centre for International Peace and Security Studies (CIPSS).

Background 
Paul was born in Kerala, India. Paul received his undergraduate education from Kerala University, India in 1977. He completed his M. Phil in international studies at Jawaharlal Nehru University, New Delhi, in 1984. He subsequently earned a PhD in political science from the University of California, Los Angeles in 1991.

Career 
Paul's book Power versus Prudence was selected as an 'Outstanding Academic Title for 2001' by the Choice Magazine and as a "Book for Understanding' by the Association of American University Presses. In March 2005 Maclean Magazine's Guide to Canadian Universities rated Paul as one of the "most popular Professors" at McGill University, and he became the recipient of the High Distinction in Research Award by McGill's Faculty of Arts in May 2005.

In December 2009, Paul's book The Tradition of Non-use of Nuclear Weapons was selected by the Nobel Peace Center in Oslo for inclusion in the Peace Prize Laureate Exhibition honouring President Barack Obama.

Paul was appointed as the editor of the Georgetown University Press book series: South Asia in World Affairs in 2010. He was the chair of ISA's International Security Section (ISSS) (2009–2011), and served as a Distinguished International Jury member of the Grawemeyer Award for Ideas Improving World Order, University of Louisville, in September 2012. He was also adjudged as Best Professor in International Relations Award, World Education Congress, Mumbai in June 2012 and was awarded KPS Menon Chair (Visiting) for Diplomatic Studies 2011–12, Mahatma Gandhi University, Kottayam, India.

He was a visiting scholar at Harvard University's Center for International Affairs (CFIA) and the Olin Institute for Strategic Studies (1997–98), and a visiting associate at the Center for Nonproliferation Studies, Monterey (2002–2003). He was a visiting professor of national security affairs at the Naval Postgraduate School (2002–03), Diplomatic Academy in Vienna (2014-present), Ritsumeikan University (2016), Ayoma Gakunin University (2017), and Nanyang Technological University (2017-2018).

He served as the president of the International Studies Association (ISA) from 2016 to 2017. During his time as the president, he led a task force on improving conditions of Global South scholars in international studies. He was instated as a Senior Fellow at the Royal Society of Canada in November 2018. Paul is the founding director of the Global Research Network on Peaceful Change (GRENPEC).

Books 

Restraining Great Powers:Soft Balancing from Empires to the Global Era (New Haven:  Yale University Press, 2018) 
The Warrior State: Pakistan in the Contemporary World (Oxford University Press, 2013) 
Globalization and the National Security State with Norrin Ripsman (Oxford University Press, 2010) 
The Tradition of Non-Use of Nuclear Weapons (Stanford University Press, 2009) 
India in the World Order: Searching for Major Power Status with B. Nayar (Cambridge University Press, 2002) 
Power versus Prudence: Why Nations Forgo Nuclear Weapons (McGill-Queen's University Press, 2000) 
Asymmetric Conflicts: War Initiation by Weaker Powers (Cambridge University Press, 1994) 

Paul is the author or editor of over 21 books. He has also published nearly 75 journal articles and book chapters.

Edited Volumes 

Oxford Handbook on Peaceful Change in International Relations (Lead Editor and Contributor with Deborah Welch Larson, Harold Trinkunas,  Anders Wivel &, Ralf Emmers) (New York: Oxford University Press, August, 2021) 
International Institutions and Power Politics (Editor and Contributor with Anders Wivel) (Washington DC: Georgetown University Press, September, 2019) 
India-China Maritime Competition: The Security Dilemma at Sea (Editor and Contributor with Rajesh Basrur and Anit Mukherjee) (London: Routledge, 2019) 
The China-India Rivalry in the Globalization Era (Editor and Contributor) Washington DC: Georgetown University Press, 2018 
Accommodating Rising Powers: Past, Present and Future (Editor & Contributor) (Cambridge University Press, 2016) 
Status in World Politics (co-editor and contributor with Deborah Larson and William Wohlforth) (Cambridge University Press, 2014) 
International Relations Theory and Regional Transformation (Cambridge University Press, 2012) 
South Asia’s Weak States: Understanding the Regional Insecurity Predicament (Editor & Contributor), Stanford: Stanford University Press (in hardcover and paperback editions), 2010 (South Asia Edition, Oxford University Press, New Delhi, 2011) 
Complex Deterrence: Strategy In the Global Age (with Patrick M. Morgan and James J. Wirtz, University of Chicago Press, 2009) 
The India-Pakistan Conflict: An Enduring Rivalry (Cambridge University Press, 2005) 
Balance of Power: Theory and Practice in the 21st Century (with J. Wirtz and M. Fortman, Stanford University Press, 2004) 
The Nation-State in Question (with G. John Ikenberry and John A. Hall, Princeton University Press, 2003) 
International Order and the Future of World Politics (with John A. Hall, Cambridge University Press, 1999) 
The Absolute Weapon Revisited: Nuclear Arms and the Emerging International Order (with Richard Harknett and James Wirtz, The University of Michigan Press, 1998 & 2000)

Selected Essays 

"Realism, liberalism and regional order in East Asia: toward a hybrid approach," Pacific Review, 35(1), Fall 2022.
"Building an Eclectic and Inclusive Global IR: Challenges and Opportunities in the 21st Century," Indian Journal of Politics and International Relations 12 (13) 2022, Jan-Feb, 38-45.
"India’s Role in South Asia; A Regional Power with Global Ambitions,” in David Shambaugh ed. International Relations of Asia, (Lanham: Rowman & Littlefield, 2022), pp.161-186.
"Globalization, De-globalization and Re-Globalization: Adapting Liberal International Order," International Affairs, 97(5), Fall 2021, pp. 1599-1620. 
"Introduction: Globalization, De-globalization and the Liberal International Order,"(with Markus Kornpbrobst) International Affairs, 97(5), Fall 2021, 1305-16.
"The Study of Peaceful Change in World Politics,” (co-author) in Paul et al eds. The Oxford Handbook of Peaceful Change in International Relations (New York: Oxford University Press, 2021), pp.3-27.
"A New Research Agenda for the Study of Peaceful Change,” (co-author) in Paul et al eds. The Oxford Handbook of Peaceful Change in International Relations (New York: Oxford University Press, 2021), pp.763-78.
"Introduction: International Institutions and Peaceful Change," (with Kai He and Anders Wivel), Ethics and International Affairs, Winter 2020,  34 (4), 457-59.
"Soft Balancing, Institutions and Peaceful Change," (with Anders Wivel), Ethics and International Affairs, Winter 2020, 34 (4), 473-85.
"The Rise of China and the Emerging Order in the Indo-Pacific Region," in Huiyun Feng and Kai He, eds. China’s Challenges and International Order Transition: Beyond the ‘Thucydides Trap’ (Ann Arbor: University of Michigan Press, 2020), pp.71-94.
"China’s Rise and Balance of Power Politics," with Zhen Han, The Chinese Journal of International Politics, 13 (1) 2020, 1-26.
 "Balance of Power," with Erik Underwood, Oxford Bibliographies in International Law, 2020, https://www.oxfordbibliographies.com/view/document/obo-9780199796953/obo-9780199796953-0202.xml?rskey=XOrnNM&result=1&q=balance+of+power#firstMatch.
"Revisiting the Security Dilemma through the Lens of India-China Relations" (with RajeshBasrur and Anit Mukherjee), Asian Security, 15(1) 2019; pp.1-4.
"Theorizing India-US-China strategic triangle," with Erik Underwood, India Review, 18 (4) 2019, 348-367.
"When Balance of Power Meets Globalization: China, India and the Small States of South Asia," Politics, 39 (1) 2019, 50-63.
"Exploring International Institutions and Power Politics,” (with Anders Wivel) in Wivel and Paul eds. International Institutions and Power Politics: Bridging the Divide (Georgetown University Press, 2019), pp.3-19.
"Maximizing Security through International Institutions: Soft Balancing Strategies Reconsidered,” (with Anders Wivel) in Wivel and Paul eds. International Institutions and Power Politics: Bridging the Divide (Georgetown University Press, 2019), pp.89-100.
"Mitigating Security Dilemma in the Sino-Indian Rivalry,” in Rajesh Basrur, Anit Mukherjee, and T.V. Paul eds. India-China Maritime Competition: The Security Dilemma at Sea (London: Routledge, 2019), pp.182-87.
"The Indian Ocean and the India-China Security Dilemma”, with Rajesh Basrur, Anit Mukherjee, in Basrur, Mukherjee, Paul eds. India-China Maritime Competition: The Security Dilemma at Sea(London: Routledge, 2019), pp.1-9.
"When Balance of Power Meets Globalization: China, India and the Small States of South Asia,” Politics, 39(1), 50-63. (Online July 2018).
"Revisiting the Security Dilemma through the Lens of India-China Relations” (with Rajesh Basrur and Anit Mukherjee), Asian Security, 15(1); pp.1-4.
"Soft Balancing vs. Hard Clashes: The Risks of War Over South China Sea,” Global Asia13 (3), September, 97-91.
"Explaining Conflict and Cooperation in the Sino-Indian Rivalry,” in Paul ed., China-India Rivalry in the Globalization Era (Washington DC: Georgetown University Press, 2018), 3-23.
“Assessing Change in World Politics,” International Studies Review, 20(2), June, 177-185
“Recasting Statecraft: International Relations and Strategies of Peaceful Change,” International Studies Quarterly, 61(1), March, 1-13.
"Nuclear Doctrines and Stable Strategic Relationships: The Case of South Asia," with Mahesh Shankar, International Affairs, 92(1); pp. 1–20.
"Self-Deterrence: Nuclear Weapons and the Enduring Credibility Challenge," International Journal, 71(1): pp. 2–40.
"Strategies for Managing China’s Rise," Harvard Asia Quarterly, 16(2), Summer 2014, 11-18.
"India’s Soft Power in a Globalizing World," Current History,  113(762) April 2014, 157-62.
"Disarmament Revisited: Is Nuclear Abolition Possible?" Journal of Strategic Studies, Vol. 35, No. 1, February 2012,  pp. 149–169.
"Taboo or Tradition: The Non-Use of “Nuclear Weapons in World Politics," Review of International Studies, 6, October 2010, pp. 853–863.
"A Plea for Puzzle-Driven International Relations Research," Qualitative & Multi-Method Research, Fall 2010, pp. 13–19.
"Integrating International Relations Studies in India to Global Scholarship," International Studies, 46 (1–2), 2010, 129–45.
"Why the US-India Nuclear Accord is a Good Deal," (with Mahesh Shankar) Survival 49 (4), Winter 2007, pp. 111–22.
"The US.-India Nuclear Accord: Implications for the Non-Proliferation Regime," International Journal, 62(4) Autumn 2007, pp. 845–61.
"Why Has the India-Pakistan Rivalry Been So Enduring? Power Asymmetry and an Intractable Conflict,:  Security Studies, 15(4) October–December 2006, 600–630.
"Soft Balancing in the Age of US Primacy," International Security, 30(1) Summer 2005, pp. 46–71.
"Globalization and the National Security State: A Framework for Analysis," (with Norrin Ripsman) International Studies Review,  7(2) June 2005, pp. 199–227.
"Under Pressure? Globalization and the National Security State," Millennium, (with Norrin Ripsman) 33 (2), December 2004, 355–380.
"Chinese/Pakistani Nuclear/Missile Ties and Balance of Power Politics," The Nonproliferation Review, 10 (2), Summer 2003, 1–9. 
"Systemic Conditions and Security Cooperation: Explaining the Persistence of the Nuclear Non-Proliferation Regime," Cambridge Review of International Affairs, 16(1), April 2003 135-55.
"The Systemic Bases of India’s Challenge to the Global Nuclear Order," Non-Proliferation Review, 6(1), Fall 1998,1–11.
"Strengthening the Non-Proliferation Regime: The Role of Coercive Sanctions," International Journal, 51(3) Summer, 1996, 440–65.
"Nuclear Taboo and War Initiation: Nuclear Weapons in Regional Conflicts," Journal of Conflict Resolution, 39(4), December 1995, 696–717.
"The Paradox of Power: Nuclear Weapons in a Changed World," Alternatives, 20(4), November 1995, 479–500.
"Time Pressure and War Initiation: Some Linkages," Canadian Journal of Political Science, 27(2) June 1995, 255–76.
"Influence through Arms Transfers: Lessons from the US-Pakistani Relationship," Asian Survey,  32(12) Dec. 1992, 1078–92.

References

External links 
Personal Website
Conversation with History interview with Harry Krelsler at the UC Berkeley Institute of International Studies in October 2009
India's Soft Power Part I Presentation at the Indian Council for Cultural Relations (ICCR)New Delhi, 12 November 2010
India's Soft Power Part II Presentation at the Indian Council for Cultural Relations (ICCR)New Delhi, 12 November 2010
China’s Rise: Hedging, Engagement, and Soft Balancing Presentation at the Conference on "The Rise of China and Alliance in East Asia: Implications for Diplomatic Truce” Institute of International Relations, National Chengchi University, Taipei, 9 December 2010
Rising Powers and Balance of Power in the 21st Century Presentation at the Conference on "Ascending Powers and the International System", Mateas Romero Institute (Mexican Diplomatic Academy) Mexico City, 14 December 2010
New South Asia in World Affairs Book Series Georgetown University, September 2011
Question of Security Hindu newspaper interview
Globalisation has reduced threat of inter-state wars Gulf Today Newspaper Report on Seminar at Gulf Research Center, Dubai. 12 February 2008

Canadian political scientists
Indian political scientists
1956 births
Living people
University of Kerala alumni
Jawaharlal Nehru University alumni
University of California, Los Angeles alumni
Academic staff of McGill University
Canadian male non-fiction writers